Rona Pondick (born April 18, 1952) is an American sculptor. She lives and works in New York City. Using the language of the body in her sculpture, in both a literal and a metaphorical sense, has been of interest to Pondick since the beginnings of her career in 1977. An abiding concern of hers has been the exploration of the use of different materials, a consistent motif that runs throughout her work from its beginnings to the present day.

Early life
Raised in Brooklyn, New York, Rona Pondick earned her Bachelor of Fine Arts from Queens College in New York in 1974. She earned a Master of Fine Arts in 1977 from Yale University School of Art in New Haven, Connecticut, where she studied sculpture with David Von Schlegell, an American sculptor, and also studied with Richard Serra, who was a visiting artist in the program at the time.

Artistry 
Pondick began to exhibit in galleries and museums in the mid 1980s, and since that time her sculpture and site-specific installations have been shown in exhibitions throughout the world. Her work can be divided into two stylistic periods: early work based on fragments that reference the human body, and later work centered around the human body as part of hybrid sculptures, merged with forms from nature of flora and fauna.

Color
In 2018, Lynn Zelevansky wrote, “Color … enhances the informality and approachability of Pondick’s new work. Each object is named for the colors it contains. Her palette begins with the primary hues for photographic printing—magenta, cyan, and yellow—to which she adds green, blue, black, and white. Made from resin, acrylic, and an epoxy modeling compound…they are each partly translucent and in places almost evanescent, changing as the light changes and as viewers move around them…  The addition of color and the new materials significantly alter the visual impact and emotional tenor of Pondick’s art.”

Artist's technique
In her sculpture, Pondick has always used traditional methods such as carving, hand-modeling, mold-making, and metal casting, and at times, has used the latest in 3D computer technologies occasionally for modeling but largely for scaling. This results in a mystery in the process, and it is often hard to discern how these objects are made.

Early work: fragments
Beginning with work from the early 1980s, Pondick has worked with fragments that invoke the body, including shoes, baby bottles, and teeth, “a quirky vocabulary of anatomical parts and body related objects that had some of Louise Bourgeois' oddity and near-surrealism and Philip Guston’s poignant, ambiguous symbolism.” These early provocative works have included scatological references in bodily assemblages. Her early work has been interpreted by critics in numerous ways, as a feminist critique of Freudian theories of sexuality, as an expression of infantile and juvenile desires, and as “Freudian vaudeville acts designed to make you laugh until you feel something caught in your throat.”

Her earliest sculptures are unmistakably scatalogical. From the late 1980s to early 1990s, Pondick made sculptures of beds using pillows, cloth, and wood, some with baby bottles strapped to them with rope.

Later work

Hybrid sculptures: Animals/Flora and the Body
Beginning in 1998, Pondick began to make sculptures that merged parts of animals and flora with those of her own body, primarily casting them in bronze or stainless steel. Pondick merged traditional hand modeling with computer technology in order to create these hybrid sculptures, which incorporate depictions of her own head and hands. For example, in her first work in the series, Dog (1998-2001), she combined a human head and hands with the body of a dog, creating a sphinx-like figure. Other human-animal hybrids include Cat, Otter, Muskrat. Monkeys, and Ram's Head. As Pondick stated, "I use the animal form because it is recognizable and holds its scale no matter where you put it."

Hybrid sculptures: Trees and the Body
In 1995, Pondick made her first sculpture of a tree using fruit scattered on the ground that incorporated human teeth. Her first tree/human hybrid sculpture incorporated the artist's miniaturized head as buds in the tree branches, using aluminum, bronze, and stainless steel. Her first tree/human hybrid sculpture was Pussy Willow Tree in 2001, commissioned by Fondation pour l’art contemporain Claudine et Jean-Marc Salomon in Annecy, France. This was followed by Cranbrook Art Museum's commission of Crimson Queen Maple in 2003, and by Head in Tree, commissioned by Sonsbeek International in 2008 and installed in the center of a pond. A sub category: “Magenta Swimming in Yellow” by Rona Pondick, 2015–17. Pigmented resin and acrylic.(Zevitas Marcus). Rona Pondick's sculptures at Zevitas Marcus gallery are both serene and nightmarish. The artist makes casts of her own head in brightly colored resins, then perches them atop tiny, atrophied bodies, or embeds them in clear cubes or plinths of contrasting color. The results are bizarre by intriguing moments suspended in time.

Awards and grants 
2020: American Academy of the Arts and Letters Purchase Award
2016: Anonymous Was a Woman Award
2000: Cultural Department of the City of Salzburg, Kunstlerhaus
1999: Bogliasco Foundation Fellowship
1996: Rockefeller Foundation Fellowship
1992: Guggenheim Fellowship
1991: Mid-Atlantic Arts Grant
1988: Art Matters Inc., New York State Council on the Arts (for Beds installation), Artists Space Grant
1985: Ludwig Vogelstein Foundation Grant
1977: Fannie B. Pardee Prize in Sculpture

Solo museum exhibitions 
This list includes material from Landau, Stoops, Van Der Zijpp, Weiermair, and Zaya.

2022-23: Österreichische Galerie Belvedere, Vienna, Austria
2017-18: Bates College Museum of Art, Lewiston, Maine
2017: Utah Museum of Contemporary Art, Salt Lake City, Utah
2010: Nassau County Museum of Art, Roslyn, New York
2009: Worcester Art Museum, Worcester, Massachusetts
2008 TR3, Ljubljana, Slovenia
2008 International Mozarteum Foundation (Die Internationale Stiftung Mozarteum), Salzburg, Austria
2004: Museum of Contemporary Art Cleveland, Cleveland, Ohio
2003: Cranbrook Art Museum, Bloomfield Hills, Michigan
2002: DeCordova Museum and Sculpture Park, Lincoln, Massachusetts
2002: Bologna Museum of Modern Art (MAMbo, or Museo d’Arte Moderna di Bologna), Bologna, Italy
2002: Groninger Museum, Groningen, Netherlands 
1999: Rupertinum Museum für moderne und zeitgenössische Kunst, Salzburg, Austria
1999-97: Brooklyn Museum of Art, Brooklyn, New York
1995: Cincinnati Art Museum, Cincinnati, Ohio
1992: The Israel Museum, Jerusalem
1991: Beaver College of Art Gallery, Glenside, Pennsylvania
1989: The Institute of Contemporary Art, Boston, Massachusetts
1988: SculptureCenter, New York City

Aside from participating in exhibitions, she also lectured at universities and institutions such as Yale University, Princeton, Columbia, and even Bezalel, Academy of Arts & Design in Israel and Palais des Beaux Arts de Lille in France.

International museum exhibitions 
Pondick's work has been included in international exhibitions including the Lyon, Venice, and Johannesburg Biennales, the Whitney Biennial, and Sonsbeek.

Museum collections 
Pondick's work is represented in museum collections including The Allen Memorial Art Museum at Oberlin College, The Brooklyn Museum, The Carnegie Museum of Art, Centre Georges Pompidou, Cleveland Museum of Art, The DeCordova Museum and Sculpture Park, The Fogg Art Museum/Harvard Art Museums, The High Museum of Art, The Los Angeles County Museum of Art (LACMA), The Metropolitan Museum of Art, The Museum of Contemporary Art, Los Angeles, The Museum of Modern Art, The Morgan Library and Museum, Nasher Sculpture Center, The National Gallery of Art, The New Orleans Museum of Art, The New York Public Library, The Rose Art Museum, The Toledo Museum of Art, The Whitney Museum, and The Worcester Art Museum.

Bibliography
2018
2017
2009
2008
2008
2004
2002
1992-1993

References

External links 
 Entry for Rona Pondick on the Union List of Artist Names
Official site of the artist
"Rona Pondick: The Metamorphosis of an Object"- 2009 exhibit at the Worcester Art Museum
Rona Pondick in Conversation with Phong Bui (March 2013)
2009 Bomb Magazine interview of Rona Pondick by Shirley Kaneda
The Artist Project, The Metropolitan Museum of Art: Rona Pondick on Egyptian sculptural fragments
Neil, Jonathan. “A Conversation with Artist Rona Pondick.” Sotheby’s Institute of Art, YouTube, 31 January 2019

American women sculptors
People from Brooklyn
1952 births
Living people
20th-century American women artists
21st-century American women artists
Queens College, City University of New York alumni
Yale School of Art alumni